Aliidiomarina is a genus of halophilic bacteria.

References 

Alteromonadales
Halophiles
Bacteria genera